Relhania speciosa is a shrublet belonging to the daisy family (Compositae or Asteraceae), indigenous to the southern Cape, South Africa.

Description 
Relhania speciosa is a shrub that reaches a height of 1-2 meters (the tallest in its genus), with stiff, recurved leaves. The leaves have distinctive lines on their underside, and smooth upper surface.

Distribution
It occurs in rocky, mountainous Fynbos vegetation, in the southern regions of the Western Cape Province and Eastern Cape Province, South Africa.

References 

Endemic flora of South Africa
Relhania speciosa
Renosterveld